|}

This is a list of electoral district results of the 1965 Western Australian election.

Results by Electoral district

Albany

Avon

Balcatta

Bayswater

Beeloo

Belmont

Blackwood

Boulder-Eyre

Bunbury

Canning

Claremont

Cockburn

Collie

Cottesloe

Dale

Darling Range

East Melville

Fremantle

Gascoyne

Geraldton

Greenough

Kalgoorlie

Karrinyup

Katanning

Kimberley

Maylands

Melville

Merredin-Yilgarn

Moore

Mount Hawthorn

Mount Lawley

Mount Marshall

Murchison

Murray

Narrogin

Nedlands

Northam

Perth

Pilbara

Roe

South Perth

Stirling

Subiaco

Swan

Toodyay

Vasse

Victoria Park

Warren

Wellington

Wembley

See also 

 1965 Western Australian state election
 Members of the Western Australian Legislative Assembly, 1965–1968
 Candidates of the 1965 Western Australian state election

References 

Results of Western Australian elections
1965 elections in Australia